Burla may refer to:

People
Burla (surname)

Places
Burla, India, a town in India
Burla, Suceava, a commune in Suceava County, Romania
Burla, a village in Unțeni Commune, Botoșani County, Romania
Burla, Russia, a rural locality (a selo) in Burlinsky District of Altai Krai, Russia
Burla (Sitna), a tributary of the river Sitna in Botoșani County, Romania
Burla (river), a river in Russia and Kazakhstan

Other uses
 Burla, an alternative name for burletta, a musical entertainment

See also
 Birla, a surname